Hollywood Casino Perryville is a casino in Perryville, Maryland, owned by Gaming and Leisure Properties (GLP) and operated by Penn Entertainment. It was the first casino to open in the state on September 17, 2010. It also offers table games such as blackjack, craps, and roulette. There is a 10 table poker room near the casino's entrance.

Hollywood Casino Perryville competes with casinos in Delaware, Pennsylvania, and Atlantic City.

Penn National Gaming (now Penn Entertainment) purchased the casino's operating business from GLP in 2021 for $31 million, and leased the property from GLP for $7.8 million per year. Penn National bought the casino in hopes of entering the online betting market in Maryland, where voters had legalized sports betting in 2020.

See also
List of casinos in Maryland

References

External links

 

Buildings and structures in Cecil County, Maryland
Tourist attractions in Cecil County, Maryland
Casinos in Maryland
Perryville, Maryland
2010 establishments in Maryland